Hualgayoc Province is a province of the Cajamarca Region in Peru. The capital of the province is the city of Bambamarca.

Political division 
The province measures  and is divided into three districts:

References

External links
  www.munibambamarca.gob.pe Official province web site

Provinces of the Cajamarca Region